Bob Ferguson (born October 19, 1954) is a Canadian former professional ice hockey player and coach.

Career 
Ferguson was selected by the New York Islanders in the 10th round (163rd overall) of the 1974 NHL amateur draft and was also drafted by the Winnipeg Jets in the 7th round (96th overall) of the 1974 WHA Amateur Draft.

Ferguson is a two-time winner of the John Brophy Award given to the ECHL coach of the year.

Awards and honors

References

External links

1954 births
Living people
Canadian ice hockey coaches
Canadian ice hockey centres
Cornwall Royals (QMJHL) players
Ice hockey people from Ontario
New York Islanders draft picks
Oshawa Generals players
Ottawa 67's players
Salem Raiders players
Sioux City Musketeers players
Sportspeople from Kingston, Ontario
Tucson Icemen players
Utica Mohawks players
Winnipeg Jets (WHA) draft picks
Canadian expatriate ice hockey players in the United States